The 2018–19 American Eagles women's basketball team represents American University during the 2018–19 NCAA Division I women's basketball season. The Eagles, led by sixth year head coach Megan Gebbia, play their home games at Bender Arena and were members of the Patriot League. They finished the season 22–11, 16–2 in Patriot League play to share the Patriot League regular season title with Bucknell. They advanced to the championship game to the Patriot League women's tournament where they lost to Bucknell. They recited an automatic trip to the WNIT where they lost in the first round to Penn.

Roster

Schedule

|-
!colspan=9 style=| Non-conference regular season

|-
!colspan=9 style=| Patriot League regular season

|-
!colspan=9 style=| Patriot League Women's Tournament

|-
!colspan=9 style=| WNIT

See also
 2018–19 American Eagles men's basketball team

References

American
American Eagles women's basketball seasons
American Eagles women's basketball
American Eagles women's basketball
American